Suleiman Omar Kumchaya (born 11 May 1952) is a Tanzanian CCM politician and Member of Parliament for Lulindi constituency in the National Assembly of Tanzania since 2005. He also worked as the president's political advisor in the State House.

References

1952 births
Living people
Chama Cha Mapinduzi MPs
Tanzanian MPs 2010–2015
Place of birth missing (living people)